Exclusive Story is a 1936 American drama film directed by George B. Seitz and written by Michael Fessier. The film stars Franchot Tone, Madge Evans, Stuart Erwin, Joseph Calleia, Robert Barrat and J. Farrell MacDonald. The film was released on January 17, 1936, by Metro-Goldwyn-Mayer.

Plot
In 1935, the numbers racket (selling of illegal lottery tickets) is big business throughout New York City, much of it controlled by mobsters, who are feared by the populace. Meanwhile, crusading, likeable young newspaper reporter Tim Higgins has just published an exposé of graft in the awarding of major city contracts, only to have his article challenged by the accused, who threatens to sue for libel. He is ordered by his editor to print an apology, Higgins is approached by Ann Devlin, the daughter of a kindly old shopkeeper near the waterfront.  She pleads for Higgins to help her father, who was just visited and ordered by a mob representative to aggressively increase his sales of lottery numbers to gullible store patrons. Higgins over many days interviews Ann, her father, and other witnesses, sometimes over dinner dates.  He jokes to his wife that he is dating a blonde. He gets help from Dick Barton, the newspaper's lawyer. At one point, they receive a package containing a dynamite bomb.  Mr. Devlin eventually sells his store to a man he does not realize is a mobster, who throws in a free sea voyage to Cuba. Suddenly, radio news reports that Devlin's ship is aflame and sinking off North Carolina.  Higgins and Barton hastily board an open-cockpit(!) airplane to fly and view the disaster, taking photographs of the burning ship. Devlin is among the passengers rescued, and he later tells his daughter that the cause of the fire can be laid at the feet of the mob. Due to having this incriminating knowledge, Devlin is killed by the mob.  In the end, however, the murderer is tricked into a confession, not only of his role but of the identities of the men at the top.

Cast 
Franchot Tone as Dick Barton
Madge Evans as Ann Devlin 
Stuart Erwin as Timothy Aloysius Higgins
Joseph Calleia as Ace Acello
Robert Barrat as Werther
J. Farrell MacDonald as Michael Devlin
Louise Henry as Tess Graham
Margaret Irving as Mrs. Higgins
Wade Boteler as O'Neil
Charles Trowbridge as James Witherspoon Sr.
William "Bill" Henry as James Witherspoon Jr.
Raymond Hatton as City Editor
J. Carrol Naish as Comos

References

External links 
 

1936 films
American drama films
1936 drama films
Metro-Goldwyn-Mayer films
Films directed by George B. Seitz
American black-and-white films
Films scored by Edward Ward (composer)
1930s English-language films
1930s American films